William Hewett may refer to:

Sir William Hewett (Lord Mayor)  (c.1505–1567), Lord Mayor of London
William Hewett (died 1840), Royal Navy officer and surveyor of the North Sea
Sir William Hewett (1834–1888), Royal Navy officer and recipient of the Victoria Cross

See also
William Hewitt (disambiguation)
William Hewlett (disambiguation)